Coralliozetus boehlkei, the Barcheek blenny, is a species of chaenopsid blenny found from the Gulf of California to Costa Rica, in the eastern central Pacific ocean. The specific name honours the ichthyologist James E. Böhlke (1930-1982) of the Academy of Natural Sciences of Philadelphia.

References
 Stephens, J. S. Jr. 1963 (31 Dec.) A revised classification of the blennioid fishes of the American family Chaenopsidae. University of California Publications in Zoology v. 68: 1–165, Pls. 1-15.

boehlkei
Fish described in 1963